The 2008–09 season of the Norwegian Premier League, the highest volleyball league for women in Norway.

League table

References

Volleyball competitions in Norway
Volley
Volley
2008 in volleyball
2009 in volleyball